Phillip "Phil" Hazel (born 3 January 1956 in Napier, New Zealand) is a New Zealand former professional darts player.

Career
Hazel reached the final of the Viva Las Vegas NZ tournament, losing to Simon Whitlock.  Despite the loss, Hazel was invited to attempt to qualify for the Las Vegas Desert Classic.  After losing his first match in the first qualifier, Hazel defeated the likes of Jason Clark, Mark Stephenson and Barrie Bates to qualify.  He lost in the first round to James Wade the world number two, but produced a brave battle.  He then won the New Zealand National Championships in earned qualification for the 2010 PDC World Darts Championship.

World Championship results

PDC
 2010: Last 72 (lost to Osmann Kijamet 2–4) (legs)

External links
Profile and stats on Darts Database

Living people
New Zealand darts players
1956 births
Professional Darts Corporation associate players
PDC World Cup of Darts team New Zealand
Sportspeople from Napier, New Zealand